Morning Heroes is a choral symphony by the English composer Arthur Bliss.  The work received its first performance at the Norwich Festival on 22 October 1930, with Basil Maine as the speaker/orator. Written in the aftermath of World War I, in which Bliss had performed military service, Bliss inscribed the dedication as follows:

"To the Memory of my brother Francis Kennard Bliss and all other Comrades killed in battle"

The work sets various poems:
 Homer, The Iliad, passages from Book VI (translation of W Leaf) and Book XIX (translation of Chapman)
 Walt Whitman, "Drum Taps"
 Wilfred Owen, "Spring Offensive"
 Li Tai Po
 Robert Nichols, "Dawn on the Somme"

The extracts are spoken by a narrator and sung by a large choir.  Juxtaposing the harsh images of trench warfare with the epic heroes of Ancient Greece, the parallels Bliss draws are essentially romantic, and the work as a whole has been criticised as being rather complacent.  Bliss himself said that he suffered from a repeating nightmare about his war experiences and that the composition of Morning Heroes helped to exorcise this.

Movements
The work falls into five sections, in the structure of a palindrome, with the first movement acting as a prologue, then fast, slow, and fast movements, and the final movement acting as an epilogue.  The work includes the respective texts.:
 I: "Hector's Farewell to Andromache" 
 II: "The City Arming"
 III: "Vigil" - "The Bivouac's Flame"
 IV: "Achilles goes to battle" - "The Heroes"
 V: "Now, Trumpeter, For Thy Close" - "Spring Offensive" - "Dawn on the Somme"

Recordings
 Chandos: Samuel West, narrator; BBC Symphony; BBC Symphony Chorus; Sir Andrew Davis, conductor.
 EMI Classics: John Westbrook, speaker; Royal Liverpool Philharmonic Orchestra and Choir; Sir Charles Groves, conductor
 BBC Radio Classics: Richard Baker, speaker; BBC Symphony Chorus; BBC Symphony Orchestra; Sir Charles Groves, conductor
 Cala: Brian Blessed, speaker; East London Chorus, Harlow Chorus, East Hertfordshire Chorus; London Philharmonic Orchestra; Michael Kibblewhite, conductor

References

Compositions by Arthur Bliss
Choral symphonies
Compositions with a narrator
1930 compositions